This is a list of the NCAA outdoor champions in the discus throw event.

Champions
Key
A=Altitude assisted

References

GBR Athletics

External links
NCAA Division I women's outdoor track and field

NCAA Women's Division I Outdoor Track and Field Championships
Outdoor track, women
discus